MFHS may refer to:
 Macquarie Fields High School, Sydney, New South Wales, Australia
 Many Farms High School, Many Farms, Arizona, United States
 Marion-Franklin High School, Columbus, Ohio, United States
 Maroa-Forsyth High School, Maroa, Illinois, United States
 Menomonee Falls High School, Menomonee Falls, Wisconsin, United States